was a village located in Tone District, northern Gunma Prefecture.

Geography
 River - Tone River

History
 April 1, 1889 - Due to the municipal status enforcement, the five villages of 上川田, 下川田, 今井, 屋形原, and 岩本 merged to form the village of Kawada.
 April 1, 1954 Merged with the town of Numata and the villages of Tonami, Ikeda, and Usune to create the city of Numata.

Dissolved municipalities of Gunma Prefecture